The Codex Writers’ Group also known as Codex is an online community of active speculative fiction writers. Codex was created in January 2004. The Codex Writers’ Group won the 2021 Locus Special Award.

History and membership requirements 

Codex was created in January 2004 by Quinn Reid, a member of Orson Scott Card's 2001 Literary Boot Camp. The focus of the group is on writers in the early stages of their careers. The forum uses the phrase 'neo-pro', which they define as "writers who've had at least one professional publication and/or participated in one of the top by-audition-only workshops, but who have not yet sold a great many stories or a number of books.".

Notable Codexians 

The following Codexians have won major awards and/or have books on shelves.  A more comprehensive listing of publications by Codex Writers can be found at the Codex Library Website.

 Steve Bein, author of the "Fated Blades" series 
 John Brown, author of the Dark God series [summer 2009]
 Tobias S. Buckell, author of Crystal Rain, Ragamuffin, and Sly Mongoose
 Curtis Chen, author of Waypoint Kangaroo and Kangaroo Too
 Aliette de Bodard, author of the Obsidian and Blood books, Nebula and Locus Award winner.
 Oghenechovwe Donald Ekpeki, author of the Nommo-winning "The Witching Hour" and editor of Dominion: An Anthology of Speculative Fiction From Africa and the African Diaspora, a British Fantasy Award winner  
 Nancy Fulda, creator of AnthologyBuilder.com
 David Macinnis Gill, author of InvisibleSun, Black Hole Sun, and Soul Enchilada
 A. T. Greenblatt, author of the Hugo-winning novelette "Burn or the Episodic Life of Sam Wells as Super" and the Nebula-winning short story "Give the Family My Love," among other awards and nominations 
 Jim C. Hines, author of the Goblin Quest series
 Elaine Isaak, author of The Singer's Crown and The Eunuch's Heir
 José Pablo Iriarte, author of Nebula Award-nominated short story "Proof by Induction" and Nebula Award- and James Tiptree Award-nominated novelette "The Substance of My Lives, the Accidents of Our Births”
 Debra Jess, author of Thunder City, Heroes of Andromeda, and Dream of My Soul
 Sharon Joss, author of the Hand of Fate series and Stars That Make Dark Heaven Light
 Sara King, author of the "After Earth" series 
 Alethea Kontis, NYTimes bestselling author of The Dark-Hunter Companion, AlphaOops: The Day Z Went First and Beauty & Dynamite
 Ken Liu, author of "The Paper Menagerie," which won the Nebula, the Hugo and the World Fantasy Awards, and The Grace of Kings and translator of The Three-Body Problem
 James Maxey, author of the Bitterwood series
 Sarah Pinsker, Nebula award-winning author of A Song for a New Day and the Nebula- and Hugo-winning "Two Truths and a Lie", among other award-nominated and -winning novelettes, novellas, and short stories
 Judson Roberts, author of the Strongbow Saga series
 Diana Rowland, author of the Demon series (Mark of the Demon [Bantam, June 2009], Blood of the Demon [Bantam, February 2010], Secrets of the Demon [DAW, January 2011]) and the White Trash Zombie series [DAW 2011]
 Lawrence M. Schoen, author of the Amazing Conroy series of stories, and founder of the Klingon Language Institute
 Ken Scholes, author of The Psalms of Isaak series [Jan 2009]
 Edmund R. Schubert, editor of Orson Scott Card's InterGalactic Medicine Show (IGMS), and How To Write Magical Words: A Writer's Companion
 Elsa Sjunneson, editor of Disabled People Destroy Science Fiction, issue 24 of Uncanny Magazine, which won the 2019 Hugo Award for Best Semiprozine and the 2019 Aurora Award for Best Related Work and nominee for the 2019 Nebula Award for Best Game Writing for the Fate Accessibility Toolkit
 Caroline M. Yoachim, author of multiple award-nominated works, including works nominated for the Nebula, among other awards

Codexians whose work has been or will be published in the Writers of the Future anthologies include Stewart C Baker, Steve Bein, Aliette de Bodard, Matt Dovey, Scott Roberts, Eric James Stone, Ken Scholes, Diana Rowland, David Goldman, Sharon Joss, Michael Livingston, Floris M. Kleijne, Andrew Gudgel, Lon Prater, William Katz, Brad Beaulieu, Quinn Reid, Matt Champine, Tom Pendergrass, Robert Defendi, Joy Marchand (writing as Joy Remy), Matt Rotundo, Elise Stephens, and Jim Hines.

Notes

External links 
 Codex Writers Group Website
 Codex Mega Blog
 World Map showing locations of Codex Members
 Books written by members of Codex
 Magazine articles written by members of Codex
 AnthologyBuilder.com

Speculative fiction writing circles
American writers' organizations
Creative writing programs
Organizations established in 2004